Marx and Venus was an Australian television comedy series broadcast on SBS TV. Set in Perth, Western Australia, the program was about two flatmates; John Marx, played by Bryce Youngman and Venus Hoy, played by Rhoda Lopez. Originally Emma Lung was to play Venus Hoy, but she pulled out of the project before filming.

The program premiered on 6 August 2007. Episodes of the show are only five minutes long, and it was generally shown around 8:30pm each Monday night.

The theme music for the opening titles is "Come on Come on" by Little Birdy.

References

External links
 Official website

Australian comedy television series
2007 Australian television series debuts
2008 Australian television series endings
Special Broadcasting Service original programming